Emmanuel David García (born 8 July 1993) is an Argentine professional footballer who plays as a midfielder for Temperley.

Career
García's career began in the system of Godoy Cruz. After being an unused substitute for a fixture versus Racing Club in the 2014 Argentine Primera División, García was selected for his professional debut during a draw with San Martín on 14 February 2015. He featured in a further sixteen matches in all competitions for Godoy Cruz across the 2015 season, before participating five times in 2016. In August 2016, García was loaned to Torneo Federal A's Gimnasia y Esgrima. Twenty-eight appearances followed, over the course of which García netted his opening goals against Deportivo Maipú and Mitre.

In 2018, following a stint in regional football with Fundación Amigos, García rejoined Gimnasia y Esgrima on a permanent contract.

Career statistics
.

References

External links

1993 births
Living people
Sportspeople from Mendoza, Argentina
Argentine footballers
Association football midfielders
Argentine Primera División players
Torneo Federal A players
Primera Nacional players
Godoy Cruz Antonio Tomba footballers
Gimnasia y Esgrima de Mendoza footballers
Gimnasia y Esgrima de Jujuy footballers
Club Atlético Temperley footballers